Rainer Widmayer is a German football manager and former player. During his active career, he played mostly in the lower divisions, except his final season, during which he played in the 2. Bundesliga for SSV Ulm. As manager, he has been assistant manager of Swiss clubs FC St. Gallen and Grasshopper Club Zürich. In Germany, he assistant managed Hertha BSC and the reserves and professional squad of VfB Stuttgart. After Markus Babbel was sacked as manager of Hertha BSC, Widmayer was appointed caretaker of the Berlin club. Several days later, having completed his duties of caretaker, Widmayer left Hertha altogether. In 2012 Widmayer was assistant coach of Markus Babbel for TSG Hoffenheim. In January 2021, Widmayer became assistant coach of the new head coach of Schalke 04, Christian Gross. In 2022, he was assistant coach of Greuther Fürth and in October he was the interim manager for one game.

References

External links

1967 births
People from Sindelfingen
Sportspeople from Stuttgart (region)
German footballers
Association football defenders
1. FC Pforzheim players
TSF Ditzingen players
VfR Pforzheim players
SSV Ulm 1846 players
2. Bundesliga players
German football managers
Hertha BSC managers
VfB Stuttgart II managers
SpVgg Greuther Fürth managers
Bundesliga managers
2. Bundesliga managers
Living people
Footballers from Baden-Württemberg